Prakash Chandra Yadav was an Indian politician and he was elected to the Lok Sabha, lower house of the Parliament of India from the Barh, Bihar in 1984-1989. Yadav's father Ram Lakhan Singh Yadav was also elected to the Lok Sabha, lower house of the Parliament of India from the Arrah, Bihar in 1991-1996.

References

Living people
People from Patna
India MPs 1984–1989
Lok Sabha members from Bihar
Indian National Congress politicians
Rashtriya Janata Dal politicians
Year of birth missing (living people)